Mohammad Taqi Mirza Rokn ed-Dowleh was a Persian prince of Qajar dynasty.

He was born in Tehran to King Mohammad Shah Qajar before 13 February 1842 (s/o a Zainab Khanum) and was created the title Rukn ud-Daula in 1868. He was governor of Tehran between 1856-1858, Khamseh 1866-1867 and 1872-1873, Zanjan 1876-1878, Governor-General of Khorasan 1876, 1881, 1883-1884, 1887-1888 and 1897, of Fars 1892-1893 and 1894-1897, and of Arabistan 1897-1901.

He received the decoration of the Imperial Portrait, and the Order of the Lion and Sun 1st class.

He died in 1901, having had left behind eight sons and six daughters.

Descendants 

 Maryam Kalali
 Amirteymour Kalali

References

External links

1808 births
1848 deaths
Recipients of the Order of the White Eagle (Russia)
Recipients of the Order of St. Anna
People from Tabriz
Qajar princes